Mamá también is a Colombian telenovela produced by Teleset for RCN Televisión. The series was aired from 18 November 2013 to 28 April 2014. The plot revolves around teen pregnancy, bullying and drugs in young people, as well as their social life during their high school stage. It stars a youth cast made up of Ana María Estupiñán, Juanita Arias, Estefanía Piñeres, and Variel Sánchez.

It premiered with a total of 8.1 rating points, occupying fifth place as the least watched program during its premiere. It ended with a total of 3.6 rating points, being the least watched program in its last episode.

Cast

Main 
 Ana María Estupiñán as Mariana Cadavid
 Juanita Arias as Andrea Turbay
 Estefanía Piñeres as Leticia Amaya
 Variel Sánchez as Bryan Pinto
 Óscar Mauricio Rodríguez as Farid Galvis
 Lissbeth Cepeda as Magdalena Llinás
 Carlos Congote as Genaro Atuesta
 Carolina Cuervo as Carolina Medina
 John Alexander Mirque as Fabio Lema

Guest stars 
 Didier van der Hove as Pablo Olarte
 Laura de León as Johana Vargas
 Sebastián Eslava as Martín Olarte
 Juan David Agudelo as Samuel Hoyos
 Nicole Santamaría as Tania
 Laura Junco as Adela Ramírez
 Harold Fonseca as Octavio Valencia
 Andrés Simón as Felipe
 Miguel González as Pascual Amaya
 Julio Sánchez Coccaro as Ángel Cadavid

References 

2013 telenovelas
2013 Colombian television series debuts
2014 Colombian television series endings
Spanish-language telenovelas
RCN Televisión telenovelas
Television series about dysfunctional families
Television series about teenagers
Sony Pictures Television telenovelas